Billy Lawrence Golden (December 31, 1933 – September 14, 2015), nicknamed "Maverick", was an American drag racer. He is probably best known for driving the Little Red Wagon A/FX wheelstander pickup exhibition racer.

History 
Born in Shawnee Township, Illinois, Golden joined the US Marines and first became interested in drag racing while at Camp Pendleton.

Golden was given his "Maverick" nickname in the late 1950s by an announcer at a Southern California dragstrip, because he chose to drive an unconventional -powered Dodge Custom Royal. He started racing in AHRA Super Stock, driving Dodges for several years. He was one of the first drivers in AHRA S/S to successfully run an automatic transmission.

By 1962, he was a factory driver, driving an S/SA Dodge.  At the 1962 AHRA Winternationals, driving his bright yellow hemi "Taxi Cab" Dodge 330, he scored a "stunning" victory over "Dyno Don" Nicholson's  factory Chevrolet at Fontana Drag City, to take the Stock Eliminator title, Chrysler's only Nationals win for 1962.

In 1963, Golden worked with Jim Nelson of Dragmasters to improve the car, and won seven Super Stock races out of eight events, taking the Midwest Championship.

At the end of the 1964 season, Chrysler proposed Golden drive the Little Red Wagon A/FX pickup. which became drag racing's first wheelstanding truck.

The crowd's very enthusiastic reaction prompted Golden to turn the A/FX truck into a wheelstanding exhibition racer, which he developed a steering mechanism for himself, relying on experience from his day job at Douglas Aircraft Corporation. The wheelstander was wrecked in 1969, 1971, and 1975; the third crash was nearly fatal to Golden.

Golden retired in 2003. He died on September 14, 2015.

Notes

External links 
Hemmings.com (biopage)

Dragster drivers
1933 births
2015 deaths
People from Gallatin County, Illinois
Military personnel from Illinois
Racing drivers from Illinois